Yarsky (masculine) or Yarskoy (masculine), Yarskaya (feminine), or Yarskoye (neuter) is the name of several rural localities in Russia:
Yarsky (rural locality), a settlement in Millerovsky District of Rostov Oblast
Yarskoy, a khutor under the jurisdiction of the urban-type settlement of Chernyshkovsky, Volgograd Oblast
Yarskoye, name of several rural localities

See also
Yarskoy 1-y, a khutor in Kumylzhensky District of Volgograd Oblast
Yarskoy 2-y, a khutor in Kumylzhensky District of Volgograd Oblast